Frank J. Olmsted (March 19, 1871 – March 24, 1958) was a member of the Wisconsin State Assembly.

Biography
Olmsted was born on March 19, 1871, in Clintonville, Wisconsin. He became involved in farming and business and married Daisy Dean Merrill. Olmsted died in 1958.

Political career
Olmsted was elected to the Assembly in 1918. Other positions he held include Chairman (similar to Mayor) of Elcho, Wisconsin from 1916 to 1918 and Assessor of Norwood, Wisconsin. He was a Republican.

References

External links

Geni.com

People from Clintonville, Wisconsin
People from Langlade County, Wisconsin
Republican Party members of the Wisconsin State Assembly
Mayors of places in Wisconsin
Farmers from Wisconsin
Businesspeople from Wisconsin
1871 births
1958 deaths
Burials in Wisconsin